The Jouvie was a French automobile manufactured from 1913 to 1914.

A JAP-engined cyclecar, it was a product of Paris.

References

Cyclecars
Defunct motor vehicle manufacturers of France
Manufacturing companies based in Paris